Lewa Airport is an airport in Kenya.

Location
Lewa Airport  is located in Lewa Wildlife Conservancy, in Isiolo District, Eastern Province (Kenya).

The geographic coordinates of Lewa Airport are: 0° 11' 34.00"N, 37° 28' 21.00"E (Latitude:0.192778; Longitude:37.472500).

Overview
Lewa  Airport is a small civilian airport, serving Lewa Wildlife Conservancy and surrounding communities.

Airlines and destinations

See also
 Lewa Wildlife Conservancy
 Isiolo District
 Eastern Province (Kenya)
 Kenya Airports Authority
 Kenya Civil Aviation Authority
 List of airports in Kenya

References

External links
  Location of Lewa Airport At Google Maps

Airports in Kenya
Eastern Province (Kenya)
Isiolo County